

Buildings

Dates approximate
 575 – Ishtar Gate in Babylon constructed.
 530 – Ennigaldi-Nanna's museum established
 520 – Temple of Olympian Zeus, Athens, begun (completed 132 CE).
 515 – Construction of Persepolis, capital of the Achaemenid Empire, begins.
 500:
Temple of Athena (Paestum) in Campania constructed.
The Magadha imperial capital of Pataliputra (modern day Patna) in the Indian Subcontinent is begun with construction of a small fort (Pāṭaligrama) near the Ganges.

References

Architecture